Hadârcă is a surname. Notable people with the surname include:

Ion Hadârcă (born 1949), Moldovan poet, translator, and politician
Petru Hadârcă (born 1963), Moldovan director and actor

Surnames of Moldovan origin